Imanol Erviti Ollo (born 15 November 1983) is a Spanish professional road bicycle racer, who currently rides for UCI WorldTeam .

Career
Born in Pamplona, Navarre, Erviti was selected to ride the 2012 Tour de France, but crashed on a large pile-up in stage 6 with  remaining with "serious wounds in his right side", that required surgery and a 48-hour hospital stay and did not start stage 7.

In 2016, he was in the early breakaway in both the cobbled Monuments: the Tour of Flanders and Paris–Roubaix. He finished both races in the top 10.

Major results

2004
 1st Stage 6 Vuelta a Navarra
2007
 1st Stage 1 (TTT) Volta a Catalunya
 1st Stage 1 (TTT) Tour Méditerranéen
2008
 1st Stage 18 Vuelta a España
2009
 4th Overall Tour Méditerranéen
1st Stage 2 (TTT)
2010
 1st Stage 10 Vuelta a España
 7th Overall Four Days of Dunkirk
2011
 1st Vuelta a La Rioja
2012
 1st Stage 1 (TTT) Vuelta a España
2014
 1st Stage 1 (TTT) Vuelta a España
 5th Time trial, National Road Championships
2016
 7th Tour of Flanders
 9th Paris–Roubaix
2017
 5th Time trial, National Road Championships

Grand Tour general classification results timeline

References

External links 

Spanish male cyclists
1983 births
Living people
Spanish Vuelta a España stage winners
Sportspeople from Pamplona
Cyclists at the 2016 Summer Olympics
Olympic cyclists of Spain
Cyclists from Navarre